Dagmar Olsson (27 September 1908 – 20 December 1980) was a Swedish film actress. She appeared in 27 films between 1931 and 1968.

Selected filmography
 The False Millionaire (1931)
 It Is My Music (1942)
 We House Slaves (1942)
 Crisis (1946)
 Perhaps a Gentleman (1950)
 Skipper in Stormy Weather (1951)
 Åsa-Nisse on Holiday (1953)
 Stupid Bom (1953)
 Lovely Is the Summer Night (1961)

References

External links

1908 births
1980 deaths
Swedish film actresses
Actresses from Stockholm
20th-century Swedish actresses